Ræstdzinad (spelled  in the first issue) is an Ossetian language daily newspaper (excluding Sunday and Monday) published in Vladikavkaz, Russia, since March 14, 1923. The circulation during recent years stood at 15,000–20,000 copies.

External links
 Official site 

Newspapers published in Russia
Newspapers published in the Soviet Union
Ossetian-language newspapers
Newspapers established in 1923
Vladikavkaz
1923 establishments in Russia